New Girl in Town may refer to

Film, TV and theatre
 New Girl in Town (1957 musical), a Tony-winning musical based on the play Anna Christie
 Friends: New Girl in Town (2012 film), film in the Lego film franchise, see List of Lego films
 Nashville Girl (1976 film), film also released as "The New Girl in Town (film)"
 "The New Girl in Town", Episode 14 of Teenage Mutant Ninja Turtles. It marks the first appearance of Karai, the adopted teenage daughter of Oroku Saki/the Shredder. 
 New Girl In Town (2012 TV episode), season 2 episode of "Dance Moms", see List of Dance Moms episodes
 New Girl in Town (The Inside episode) (2005 TV episode), season 1 episode 1 of "The Inside" crime drama TV series
 New Girls in Town (2005 TV episode), season 1 episode of "The Girls Next Door", see List of The Girls Next Door episodes
 The New Girl In Town (2002 TV episode), season 2 episode of "As Told by Ginger", see List of As Told by Ginger episodes
 New Girl in Town (1998 TV episode), season 4 episode of "Hang Time", see List of Hang Time episodes
 "There's a New Girl in Town" (2009 episode), season 2 episode of "The Real Housewives of New York City", see List of The Real Housewives of New York City episodes

Music

Albums
 The New Girl in Town (1985 album), unreleased album by "Selena y Los Dinos"

Songs
"New Girl In Town", song by	Buddy Bregman and His Orchestra  	  Theme, Merrill	1957
"A New Girl In Town", song by	Louise Mandrell	R. C. Bannon, John Bettis 1984
"There's a New Girl in Town", theme song for Alice (TV series), performed by Linda Lavin

See also
 The Berenstain Bears and the New Girl in Town, a children's picture book in the Berenstain Bears franchise
 New Girl (disambiguation)